The statue of Queen Victoria is a bronze sculpture depicting Queen Victoria by British artist Albert Bruce-Joy, installed outside the British Columbia Parliament Buildings, in Victoria, British Columbia. The  statue was commissioned by Richard McBride in 1912, and completed in 1914. World War I delayed the sculpture's unveiling until 1921.

the statue was vandalized in 2021

See also

 Cultural depictions of Queen Victoria
 List of statues of Queen Victoria

References

External links
 

1914 sculptures
1921 establishments in British Columbia
Bronze sculptures in British Columbia
Monuments and memorials in British Columbia
Outdoor sculptures in Victoria, British Columbia
Sculptures of women in Canada
Statues in Canada
Victoria, British Columbia
Vandalized works of art in Canada